Norway – Sudan relations are international relations between Norway and Sudan.

Sudan has an embassy in Oslo. Norway has an embassy in Khartoum.

There are 1,318 Sudanese people living in Norway. Most of them are Christian refugees and people from Darfur. Norway's Ministry of Foreign Affairs discourages people from travelling to Darfur because of the ongoing civil unrest.

Norway is a donor of humanitarian aid to Sudan. Norway played a key role in the negotiations for the Comprehensive Peace Agreement between Northern Sudan and Southern Sudan to end the Second Sudanese Civil War.

History
In 2005 Norway helped broker the Comprehensive Peace Agreement and hosted a humanitarian aid conference to raise international money for the Sudan. In 2006 Norway was one of the few European nations that contributed to the United Nations peacekeeping force during the War in Darfur. 170 specialist troops were sent. In 2007 Erik Solheim, the Norwegian Minister for International Cooperation visited the Sudan and met with Salva Kiir Mayardit. At a joint press conference it was announced that Norway would provide $US 100 million a year for development. In 2008 Norway said it would provide $US 490 million in humanitarian aid for the period of 2008 through 2011. The announcement was made during a three-day donor conference hosted by Norway. The total amount raised at the meeting was US$ 4.8 billion. At the meeting Sudanese Vice President Ali Osman Taha called for increased support. Hilde Frafjord Johnson, the former Norwegian aid minister who help broker the 2005 peace accord, said the peace effort suffered two setbacks: the death of John Garang in the 2005 plane crash, and the continued fighting Darfur.

See also 
 Foreign relations of Norway
 Foreign relations of Sudan
 People of African descent in Norway

References 

 
Sudan
Bilateral relations of Sudan